Orchestra Kristal (Bulgarian: оркестър Кристал) are a popular Bulgarian pop-folk or chalga band from Yambol. It is one of two bands, the other being the similarly named Orchestra Kristali from Mihailovgrad, symbolizing the pop-folk genre in Bulgaria.

Discography

Studio albums

Bulgarian albums 

 Vǎrnete se, bǎlgari (1991)
 Robinja sǎm tvoja (1993)
 Mili moj (1994)
 Toni Dačeva i duet Šans (1995)
 Toni Dačeva i Mustafa Čaušev (1995)
 Kralica sǎm az (1996)
 Vsičko e ljubov (1998)
 Edna celuvka (1999)
 V novija vek (1999)
 Magija (2001)
 Na trapeza s ork. Kristal (2001)
 Kjučeci (2002)
 Na trapeza s ork. Kristal 2 (2002)
 Balkanika (2003)
 Na trapeza s ork. Kristal 3 (2003)
 Romski biseri (2004)
 Tik Tak (2004)
 Čat-čat (2004)
 Super kjučeci (2005)
 Hit kjučeci (2006)

Turkish Albums 

 Bizim İkimiz Esmeriz (2001)
 Reyhan ve Ork. Kristal (2002) 
 Biz Şekeriz (2003) 
 Tatlı Kız (2004) 
 Kaderim (2005) 
 Al Beni (2006)

Compilations 

 Hitovete na Kristal (1997) 
 Zlatnite Hitove na ork. Kristal (2006)

Video albums 

 Ork. Kristal (1991) 
 Robinya sum tvoya (1992) 
 Mili Moi (1993) 
 Kristal i Priyateli (1995) 
 Vsichko e lyubov (1998) 
 Na trapeza s ork. Kristal 2 (2003) 
 Biz şekeriz (2003) 
 Na trapeza s ork. Kristal 3 (2003)

References

Bulgarian musical groups
Culture in Yambol